Lincoln Square is the name of both a square and the surrounding neighborhood within the Upper West Side of the New York City borough of Manhattan.  Lincoln Square is centered on the intersection of Broadway and Columbus Avenue, between West 65th and West 66th streets. The neighborhood is bounded by Columbus Avenue and Amsterdam Avenue to the east and west, and West 66th and 63rd Street to the north and south. However, the term can be extended to refer to the neighborhood between West 59th Street and West 72nd Street. It is bounded by Hell's Kitchen, Riverside South, Central Park, and the Upper West Side proper. The studios for WABC-TV are located here.

The area includes the 66th Street–Lincoln Center station, served by the New York City Subway's , and anchored by Lincoln Center, a performing-arts venue.

Lincoln Square is part of Manhattan Community District 7 and its primary ZIP Code is 10023. It is patrolled by the 20th Precinct of the New York City Police Department.

History 
Lincoln Square is located on the site of San Juan Hill, a predominantly African American neighborhood of tenements. San Juan Hill was generally bordered by Amsterdam Avenue to the east, West End Avenue to the west, 59th Street to the south, and 65th Street to the north. It has been suggested that the area was named after the 10th Cavalry that fought with Theodore Roosevelt at the Battle of San Juan Hill during the Spanish–American War, but this is not certain.  It was possibly the most heavily populated African-American neighborhood in Manhattan in the early 20th century. One of the blocks within the neighborhood contained almost 5,000 residents.

Notable residents had included Thelonious Monk, who came to live here in 1922. In addition to the significant African American community, there was also an Afro-Caribbean community there, which has left its traces in the Bye-ya and Bemsha Swing compositions of Thelonious Monk, co-written much later with Denzil Best, who also grew up in this neighborhood. James P. Johnson also lived in the neighborhood in the 1910s and 1920s, during which time he created the "Charleston" dance.

In 1940, the New York City Housing Authority characterized the area as "the worst slum section in the City of New York" and made plans to renew the area by demolishing the old tenements. The Amsterdam Housing Projects were built on the cleared land in 1948, replacing three blocks that had collectively housed 1,100 residents.

During the 1950s and 1960s, a consortium of civic leaders and others led by John D. Rockefeller III built the Lincoln Center as part of the "Lincoln Square Renewal Project" during urban planner Robert Moses's program of urban renewals. Respected architects were contracted to design the major buildings on the site, and construction started in 1959. Over the next thirty years the previously blighted area around Lincoln Center became a new cultural hub. Over 7,700 residents were displaced during the redevelopment project. The new developments contained 4,400 housing units, of which only a few were allocated to San Juan Hill's former residents. Most of the area's former residents instead moved to Harlem, another predominantly African American neighborhood in Upper Manhattan, as well as the Bronx.

Name 
Lincoln Center was named after Lincoln Square. The reason for naming the area "Lincoln Square" is unknown, however. The name was bestowed on the area in 1906 by the New York City Board of Aldermen, but records give no reason for choosing that name.

There has long been speculation that the name came from a local landowner, because the square was previously named Lincoln Square. City records from the time show only the names Johannes van Bruch, Thomas Hall, Stephan de Lancey, James de Lancey, James de Lancey Jr. and John Somerindyck as area property owners.

The area may also have been named as a tribute to U.S. President Abraham Lincoln. One speculation is that references to President Lincoln were omitted from the records because the mayor in 1906 was George B. McClellan Jr., son of General George B. McClellan who was general-in-chief of the Union Army during the American Civil War and a bitter rival of Lincoln.

Demographics 
Based on data from the 2010 United States Census, the population of Lincoln Square was 61,489, an increase of 6,250 (11.3%) from the 55,239 counted in 2000.

As of the 2010 Census, the racial makeup of the neighborhood was 73.4% (45,103) White, 4.4% (2,710) African American, 0.1% (58) Native American, 11.2% (6,916) Asian, 0.0% (14) Pacific Islander, 0.3% (175) from other races, and 1.9% (1,196) from two or more races. Hispanic or Latino of any race were 8.6% (5,317) of the population.

Points of interest 

 ABC Television Center East studios, and its flagship station WABC-TV
 American Folk Art Museum
 Amsterdam Houses, New York City Housing Authority
 Leonard Bernstein Way (West 65th Street between Amsterdam Avenue and Broadway)
 Central Park
 Church of St. Paul the Apostle
 Church of the Good Shepherd (152 West 66th Street)
 Columbus Circle
 Dante Park
 Ethical Culture Fieldston School, Lower School
 Fiorello H. LaGuardia High School of Music & Art and Performing Arts
 Fordham University Lincoln Center campus
 Holy Trinity Church
 Peter Jennings Way (W. 66th Street between Columbus Avenue and Central Park West)

 Juilliard School
 Martin Luther King Jr. Educational Campus
 Lincoln Center
 Lincoln Square farmers market (at Richard Tucker Square)
 Lincoln Square Synagogue
 Manhattan New York Temple (The Church of Jesus Christ of Latter-day Saints)
 Merkin Concert Hall
 Museum of Biblical Art (American Bible Society)
 New York Institute of Technology
 New York Society for Ethical Culture
 Richard Tucker Square
 Sesame Workshop
 West Side YMCA

Notable residents 
 Barbara Hillary (1931–2019), the first African-American woman to reach both the North Pole and South Pole, was born in San Juan Hill.

References 
Notes

Further reading
 Grand Buildings, but Also a Sense of Community, The New York Times, April 30, 2006

External links 

 Lincoln Square BID
 Lincoln Square Community Council records, circa 1953–1981. Held by the Department of Drawings & Archives, Avery Architectural & Fine Arts Library, Columbia University.
 Lincoln Square Urban Renewal Project photographs, circa 1957–1958. Held by the Department of Drawings & Archives, Avery Architectural & Fine Arts Library, Columbia University.

 
Squares in Manhattan